Anu is a Mesopotamian god.

Anu or ANU may also refer to:

Mythology
Anu (goddess), an Irish goddess
 Anu, a son of King Yayati in Hindu mythology

People
Anu (name), a given name and surname (including a list of people with the name)
Queen Anu (died 1696), Mongolian noblewoman and warrior
Anu (game character) or A Nu, a character in the video game The Legend of Sword and Fairy
ANU (band), a Tibetan rap group from Mainland China.

Abbreviations
Australian National University
Anant National University, a university in India
Andong National University, a university in South Korea
IATA airport code for V. C. Bird International Airport, Antigua

Other uses
Anu (film), 2009 Kannada film
Anu (1998 film), a 1998 Indian film by Satarupa Sanyal
aṇu, the Sanskrit term for "smallest particle of matter" in Indian atomism, pronounced and more commonly spelled as "arnoo". 
ānu, a Sanskrit term for "man" or "foreigner" and the name of a Vedic tribe
Anu (fly), a genus of Hoverfly
anu, a.k.a. mashua, an Andean vegetable
Anu-Hkongso language, a Sino-Tibetan language of Burma
Anu Jur, a.k.a. the Akhurian River